Air Chief Marshal (Ret.) Yuyu Sutisna (born 10 June 1962) is a retired air chief marshal who was the 27th Chief of Staff of the Indonesian Air Force. Previously, he had served as deputy chief of staff, in addition to commander of the 1st Air Force Operational Command and the national air defense forces command.

Early career

Yuyu graduated from the Indonesian Air Force Academy by 1986 and pursued a career at the Iswahyudi Air Force Base where he flew an F-5 Tiger. He eventually became the base's commander in 2012. As a pilot, he managed to get total of 4,250 flying hours, 2,000 of which are with an F-5 Tiger.

He later also was appointed to a position within Air Force HQ, becoming an advisor to the Chief of Staff in 2015. On 5 January 2016, he was appointed the 25th commander of 1st air force operational command. A year later, he was appointed commander of the national air defense forces command. By the end of 2017, he was appointed deputy chief of staff of the air force.

Chief of Staff of the Air Force

Upon the elevation of Hadi Tjahjanto as Commander of the Indonesian National Armed Forces, Yuyu was appointed to replace him on 16 January 2018, after having the position vacant for over a month. Along with the post, he was promoted to air chief marshal.

He stated that acquiring Sukhoi Su-35 fighters would be a top priority in his term, and planned to finalize a contract by the end of January 2018. The contract was signed in February, with the Indonesian government placing orders for 11 SU-35s worth $1.14 billion.

References

1962 births
Living people
People from Bandung
Indonesian Air Force air marshals
Chiefs of Staff of the Indonesian Air Force
Sundanese people